Dimba is a nickname. It may refer to:

 Dimba (footballer, born 1973), Editácio Vieira de Andrade, Brazilian football striker
 Dimba (footballer, born 1992), Marcos Vinícius Gomes de Lima, Brazilian football forward